Ram Setu is a 2022 Indian Hindi-language action-adventure film directed by Abhishek Sharma. The film stars Akshay Kumar, Jacqueline Fernandez, Nushrratt Bharuccha and Satya Dev and follows an archeologist who is investigating the nature of Rama Setu, also known as Adam's Bridge.

The film was announced in November 2020 with principal photography commencing in Mumbai on 30 March 2021. Production suffered setbacks and delays amid the COVID-19 pandemic. Filming resumed in October 2021 and wrapped in January 2022 taking place near Ooty, Gujarat, Daman and Diu, Maldives and Mumbai.

Ram Setu was theatrically released on 25 October 2022 during Diwali festivities and opened to negative reviews from critics. The film grossed 93 crore at the worldwide box office, failing to recoup its 150 crore budget.

Plot 

An ASI archaeologist, Dr. Aryan Kulshreshtra is a strong believer in scientific facts. He does not believe in God. He has already discovered, with an international team from India, Pakistan, Afghanistan and Japan, the treasure of Raja Dahir and a large reclining Buddha statue - both near the Buddhas of Bamyan in Afghanistan after their destruction by the Taliban (with Dahir's treasure later being divided between India and Pakistan in Islamabad).

In 2007, in an effort by the government to demolish the Rama Setu for building a canal, Aryan is asked to draft a report for the Supreme Court of India showing that the bridge is a natural formation. He initially rejects the offer, not having studied the bridge himself, but after being promised a promotion, he submits a report stating that "Ramayana is an epic fiction, not history" and questions the existence of Rama. Thus, he is met with complete hostility. In court, the government is humiliated by the report, submitted as an affidavit, as it questions the existence of Rama, and the public is furious. The consequences lead to Aryan getting suspended temporarily. And the hostility later led to Aryan's son's bullying in school and Aryan first hand witnesses the hostility shown by the bully's parents. 

Meanwhile, Aryan also gets an offer from a rich businessman, Indrakant, who wants the Rama Setu demolished for good. He tries to persuade Aryan to join an archaeological exploration and research for the Rama Setu. He rejects it, fearing more hostility from the public, but after remembering the incident with his son, he decides to prove the "truth". Aryan hence, accepts the mission and meets fellow scientists, Dr. Sandra Rebello and Dr. Gabrielle, who are assigned to work with him. Initial research shows that Rama Setu is 18,000 years old, which is much older than Rama himself, who according to Pushkar Bhatnagar, in Dating The Era of Lord Ram, was born more than 7,000 years ago. This is not enough for Aryan, so he decides to bring another floating rock from the Rama Setu and uses carbon dating to find its age. He also visits deep underwater and finds the coral reefs. This starts to prove that Rama Setu is indeed man-made, about 7000 years ago, and has a possibility of being built by Rama. He reports this to Indrakant, who appreciates Aryan's impartiality towards the mission. However, Indrakant only wants the proof that Rama Setu is older than Rama and hence it is not built by him, so that they can demolish the structure and save money and fuel for their project. He decides to have the trio killed. On another mission to extract more rocks from Rama Setu, Dr. Gabrielle, Dr. Sandra Rebello, and Aryan go deepwater. Suddenly their, submarine stops working and they get stuck, with low oxygen levels, they desperately try to escape.

The three manage to escape with the help of a man on a boat, Anjaneyan Pushpakumaran 'AP'. He rescues them and takes them to a remote island in Sri Lanka, which is currently affected by the ongoing civil war. He agrees to help the trio on their cause. He says that he will help them out, but only for monetary gain. With AP's help, Aryan is able to stop the canal's construction and prove in court that the Rama Setu was indeed man-made and the story of Ramayana is true (by finding archaeological evidence of Lanka in Ashok Vatika, Seetha Amman Temple, Ella and Sri Pada in Sri Lanka), that Rama could have existed. Later he also comes to the conclusion that Anjaneyan was not an ordinary human, but Lord Hanuman himself.

Cast

Production

Development 
According to a report in The Financial Express, director Abhishek Sharma has been trying to build a plot since 2007 when he became aware of a court case involving Rama Setu. The film is co-produced by Akshay Kumar's mother Aruna Bhatia and Vikram Malhotra under the production companies Kumar's Cape of Good Films, Abundantia Entertainment, Lyca Productions and Amazon Prime Video. This is Amazon's first Bollywood production in India. Aruna Bhatia died in September 2021. Chandraprakash Dwivedi was signed as the creative producer. Kumar described the film as "a bridge between generations past, present and future". Co-producer Vikram Malhotra, CEO of Abundantia Entertainment, touted the film as "a story formed on facts, science and historical heritage".

The film team consulted the book Dating The Era of Lord Ram (2004), as well as experts in archeology and other areas.

Casting 
In early March 2021, media reports confirmed that Jacqueline Fernandez and Nushrratt Bharuccha were signed up to play lead roles in the film opposite Kumar. In June 2021, Satyadev Kancharana revealed that he will be a part of the film, marking his debut in Hindi cinema.

Filming 
The official announcement of the film was on 14 November 2020 coinciding with Diwali. Earlier reports in December 2020 suggested that the film shooting would take place in Ayodhya and the proposed film city in Gautam Buddha Nagar district of National Capital Region in Uttar Pradesh. The muhurat shot followed by a puja ceremony by the team was held on 18 March 2021 at Ram Janmabhoomi temple in Ayodhya. A planned visit to Ram ki Paidi ghats in Ayodhya by the lead actors was cancelled due to a large uncontrolled gathering of people.

COVID-19 break 
Principal photography began on 30 March 2021 in Mumbai. A massive set was constructed on Madh Island where shooting was scheduled to start on 5 April. However, on 4 April, Kumar tested positive for COVID-19, and a day later, on 5 April, 45 members of the filming crew tested positive, leading to the filming being indefinitely halted. Co-producer Malhotra denied the reports, claimed they were "absolutely inaccurate and a total misrepresentation of facts" and said that 25 people who tested positive, at an off-location testing site, were removed from those who had qualified to be part of the filming crew.

At the same time, the Government of Maharashtra imposed a lockdown to curb the spread of second wave of the COVID-19 pandemic. This, combined with many crew members testing positive, led the filmmakers to cancel the Mumbai schedule and demolish the set on Madh Island.

Kumar then went to work on his other films, including Raksha Bandhan, Cuttputlli which had a two-month long schedule in London that ended in October, before returning to shooting for Ram Setu.

Shooting 
Earlier reports indicated that filming would resume in September 2021, however, it only did in mid-October 2021 with a schedule in Ooty. Major underwater action scenes, oceanic shoots, and climax were to be shot in Sri Lanka. This was not possible due to the COVID-19 pandemic in Sri Lanka which made it difficult for the filming team to travel under quarantine restrictions. The filmmakers scouted for an alternate location in Kerala and Gujarat. Due to rising cases of COVID in Kerala, it was not selected. At the end, Daman and Diu was chosen for shooting. Some scenes were also shot in Mumbai and the sequences were finished. By 5 December, shooting in Diu was completed. On 31 January 2022, Kumar wrapped up shooting. An actual exosuit was planned to be used for the underwater scenes, however, due to the challenges of wearing it and shooting in it, the team opted for a replica. The budget of the film is Rs. 85 Crore.

Soundtrack 

The music of the film is composed by Ajay-Atul, Vikram Montrose, Ved Sharma and Dr. Zeus. Lyrics are penned by Irshad Kamil, Manoj Muntashir, Shekhar Astitwa and Baljit Singh Padam. The film score is composed by Daniel B. George.

Marketing 
In late April 2022, the filmmakers released a poster depicting Akshay Kumar, Satyadev and Fernandez. The poster, which went viral, was soon met with cyber-trolling on social media in the form of memes as Akshay Kumar is seen holding a burning torch while Fernandez is seen holding a powerful torchlight. In October, the filmmakers released a mobile game featuring the main characters of the film–Dr. Aryan Kulshrestha, Sandra and AP.

Release

Theatrical 
In June 2022, reports surfaced claiming that Ram Setu would have an OTT release instead of a theatrical release. Some reports claimed that this was due to underperformance of Kumar's earlier films–Samrat Prithviraj (2022) and Bachchhan Paandey (2022). The filmmakers clarified the reports to be inauthentic and that the film would have a theatrical release. The film was released on 25 October 2022, during Diwali festivities.

Home media 
After the theatrical release, the film is scheduled to be available for streaming on Amazon Prime Video.

Reception

Critical response 
Ram Setu received negative reviews from critics; on review aggregator Rotten Tomatoes, the film holds an approval rating of 20%, based on 10 reviews.

Shubhra Gupta of The Indian Express rated the film 1.5 out of 5 stars and termed the film as a "pedestrian experience" and interested only in hammering home its message". Anna M. M. Vetticad of Firstpost called the movie a Hindutva project, noting that the director unapologetically obscured the difference between fact and fiction by having "no credible progression in the script" in Kumar's character's turn from a proud atheist into social media propagandist. She criticized the "limp storytelling", the amateur and "blatantly wannabe-Bahubaali" visual effects, and the performance of the cast, but praised that of Satyadev's. Vetticad also wrote that it was "surprisingly flat for a film dealing with potentially explosive material". Namrata Joshi reviewing for Screen International wrote that the plot lacks imagination and originality, and the action scenes without thrill. She opined that the film portrayed Hindu supremacy, rather hidden across the narrative, and Hindu victimhood in parallel. She concluded that Ram Setu is yet another propaganda film in the right-wing Bollywood in which Akshay Kumar acts as the flag bearer, and the film turned out unimpressive. Subhash K. Jha wrote in Firstpost that the film depends on Hindutva ideology and later forces itself into mythology. He opined that the film has been part of a larger efforts by the left-wing of mocking and diminishing any film that has a pro-Hindutva core and noted that the understanding of the film as a "pro-establishment propaganda" is baseless. He found the performance of the entire cast, except that of Satyadev's, to be dull. He also noted that the film could have focused on the debate of faith vs blind faith rather indulged in Indiana Jones-like adventure.

Saibal Chatterjee reviewing for NDTV rated 1/5 and wrote that the film presents theories about Indian history that do not concur with scientific and scholarly studies blurring the lines between history, mythology and fantasy. He wrote that the film is "[p]oorly written, shoddily mounted and badly acted" posing a clueless crew with primitive visual effects ultimately presenting a message to chastize non-believers of Rama. Tina Das reviewing for ThePrint rated 2.5/5 and wrote that the film tries to convince the audience that Hinduism, and religion in general, redeems them. She wrote about Kumar's performance as unconvincing despite trying to imitate the protagonists of Indiana Jones and National Treasure; she wrote that the film incorporated Hindutva ideology along with history and myth and criticized visual effects and CGI animation to be faulty. She opined that if one manages to ignore these nuances, the film would be thrilling. Nandini Ramnath in Scroll.in criticised Ram Setu describing it as "WhatsApp forwards with visual effects". She wrote, "[t]here is no scope for logic or even basic common sense in a narrative that insists that religious belief must be placed above secular knowledge." She also found the plot and the performance of the cast to be lacking. Anuj Kumar of The Hindu criticized the movie stating that it is similar to cultural manifesto of the ruling Bharatiya Janata Party-led government. He compared the film with Vivek Agnihotri-directed The Kashmir Files (2022)–where both the films depicted liberal and secular values within the Hindu society as a danger that needs to be dealt with; both the films were written with from the point-of-view of the persecution complex of the majority and preach Hindus that they are amidst a war between civilizations. He also noted that the film depicts those holding contrarian views and those who do not have faith in Rama are to be retaliated against. He found the cast performance to be subpar and the visual effects to be fake.

Abhimanyu Mathur reviewing for Hindustan Times found the film to be fun and thrilling. He wrote that the underwater filming reminds one of The Blue Planet, a nature documentary by BBC. He noted that the purpose of the entire cast seemed to only accompany Kumar's character without engaging in the plot, however he praised Pravesh Rana and Satya Dev. He opined that the film gave Kumar an opportunity to perform differently compared to his recent films which attracted criticism as "public service announcements disguised as motion pictures". He found the background score to be the best in Hindi films this year, but found visual effects and computer graphics questionable. He opined that when one manages to ignore the melodrama, the film would be fun. Nairita Mukherjee of India Today rated the film 2 out of 5 stars and wrote "Ram Setu feels highly underwhelming. It has little or no cinematic appeal. In the end, it is neither funny nor serious". Sanchita Jhunjhunwala of Zoom, rating the film 3 stars, said "The film is based on a premise that is interesting, but feels like a drag every now and then while also seeming too ambitious." Bollywood Hungama rated the film 2.5 out of 5 stars and praised its premise to be interesting and climax to be well executed but criticised the plot and VFX.

Devesh Sharma of Filmfare rated the film 2.5 out of 5 stars and wrote "The film revolves around Akshay Kumar. He has tried his best to be a geeky academic and has vastly underplayed his part". Pratikshya Mishra of The Quint rated the film 2.5 out of 5 stars and wrote "Ram Setu disappoints primarily because of how shoddy the script and its treatment is". Himesh Mankad of Pinkvilla rated the film 2.5 out of 5 stars and wrote "Ram Setu isn't a bad film, but it's not good either – It lies somewhere in between. The subject will have some takers, but we wish, the director had gone wider with his vision by integrating opposition from the natural forces too, and not just stick to the human evils". Renuka Vyavahare of The Times of India rated the film 2 out of 5 stars and wrote "Barring a few decent chase sequences, Ram Setu has no spark and is way too preachy". Nishad Thaivalappil of News 18 rated the film 0.5 out of 5 stars and criticised the film writing that the film has a poor plot-line, VFX and storytelling.

Audience reception 
The word of mouth publicity among the audience did not fare well and lead to a lower footfall and thus causing lower box office collections.

Reactions 
Indian politician Subramanian Swamy stated in August 2022 that he had "through Satya Sabharwal Adv issued Legal Notice to Cine Actor Akshay Kumar (Bhatia) and his 8 others for distorting Ram Setu saga."

Narottam Mishra, Home Minister of Madhya Pradesh, praised the movie stating that the film would reveal the truth about the Ram Setu bridge and said that it was man-made and built during the period of Ramayana.

Box office
Ram Setu opened in theaters to expectations from trade analysts of having a good opening at the box office given the release during the holiday season surrounding Diwali. The film competed with the Ajay Devgn-starred Thank God, which was released on the same day, and managed to gain higher share of the box office collections. During its earlier run, the film, which was released a day after Diwali, took advantage of the festive-season holidays; however the collections fell short of expectations of analysts. The film collected  crore at the domestic box office on its opening day and  crore on its second day. It became the second biggest opening in terms of box office collections for the year with Brahmāstra: Part One – Shiva in the lead. The film has grossed  crore domestic and  crore overseas taking the worldwide collection of  crore as of 24 November.

See also 
 Coral reefs in India
 Sethusamudram Shipping Canal Project

Notes

References

External links 
 
 
 

2022 films
2020s Hindi-language films
Indian action adventure films
Films shot in Mumbai
Films shot in Ooty
Films shot in Daman and Diu
Films shot in Gujarat
Films shot in the Maldives
Advertising and marketing controversies in film
Films directed by Abhishek Sharma
Film productions suspended due to the COVID-19 pandemic
Lost world films
Films set in 2007
Films set in Sri Lanka (1948–present)
Films about the Sri Lankan Civil War
Films set in the Indian Ocean
Underwater action films
Films featuring underwater diving
Films based on the Ramayana
Films set in Tamil Nadu
Gulf of Mannar
Palk Strait
Films set in Afghanistan
War in Afghanistan (2001–2021) films
Works about the Taliban
Bamyan Province
Films set in Pakistan
Films set in Islamabad
Films about archaeology
Films about Buddhism
Ancient India in popular culture
Films about Hinduism
Films with atheism-related themes
Indian courtroom films
Hindi-language action adventure films